Cuproxena argentina is a species of moth of the family Tortricidae. It is found in Argentina.

References

External links

A
Moths of South America
Endemic fauna of Argentina
Moths described in 1991